Sweden competed at the 2016 European Athletics Championships in Amsterdam, Netherlands, from 6–10 July 2016. The Swedish federation has nominated a total of 62 athletes to compete at the championships.

Medalists

Men

Track and road

Field

Combined events – Decathlon

Women

Track and road

Field

References

Nations at the 2016 European Athletics Championships
Sweden at the European Athletics Championships
European Athletics Championships